Toddville is an unincorporated community in Dorchester County, Maryland, United States. Toddville has a post office with ZIP code 21672.

References

Unincorporated communities in Dorchester County, Maryland
Unincorporated communities in Maryland
Maryland populated places on the Chesapeake Bay